Critical applied linguistics (CALx) is an interdisciplinary critical approach to English applied linguistics. One of the central concerns in this approach is exposing the political dimensions and power relations involved in  mainstream applied linguistics, in areas like language teaching, language policy and planning, language testing, language rights, and so on.

Further reading

Critical theory
Applied linguistics